Valentin Mejinschi (born 24 January 1967) is a Moldovan police general and former politician. He held the office of Minister of Internal Affairs of Moldovain 2008 and Deputy Prime Minister from 2008 to 2009.

References

Notes 

1967 births
Living people